Goshta Choti Dongraevadhi(गोष्ट छोटी डोंगराएवढी) is a Marathi film, released on 14 July 2009. The film, produced by Makarand Anaspure, Sayaji Shinde, and Suresh Suvarna, is directed by Nagesh Bhonsle. The film starring Makarand Anaspure, Sayaji Shinde, Nagesh Bhosale and Girija Oak tells the story of poor farmers and how they are being wronged by society and government. Nana Patekar lent his voice to narrate few lines at the end of this film. Nilu Phule made a special appearance and it was his last film as he died in July  2009.

Plot 
The film focuses on the plight of farmers in Maharashtra's drought hit region. Nandu is a heavily indebted farmer. Rajaram, Nandu's best friend, comes to village to earn bread and butter. Rajaram, a graduate in agriculture science, feels disappointed as he did not find good job in city. He wants to make some money by selling land but his mother prevents him from doing this and the story continues.

Cast 
 Nagesh Bhosale as Nandu
 Makarand Anaspure as Rajaram
 Nilu Phule....Special Appearance
 Girija Oak as Vaidehi
 Sayaji Shinde as Agriculture Minister
 Madhu Kambikar As Rajaram's mother
 Madhavi Juvekar As Nandu's wife

Production 
Sayaji Shinde, Makarand Anaspure and Cinematographer Suresh Suvarna Director Nagesh Bhosale came together to start their own production house. This was the first film of the production house.

References

External links
 

2009 films
2000s Marathi-language films